The 2019–20 Superliga was the 64th season of the Polish Superliga, the top men's handball league in Poland. A total of fourteen teams contested this season's league, which began on 30 August 2019, and was prematurely ended due to the 2020 coronavirus outbreak.

On 23 March 2020, the governing body of the competition decided to end the season, and declare PGE Vive Kielce the winners, as the first placed team in the regular season standings. 

The team from Kielce won their 17th title of the Polish Champions.

Format
The competition format for the 2019–20 season consists of 14 teams each playing a total of 26 matches, half at home and half away, with the first placed team in the standings earning the Polish Championship. The last placed team is directly relegated to the 1st league, and the penultimate team in the standings play relegation playoffs with the willing team from the 1st league.

The winners are entitled to play in the EHF Champions League the following season. The 2nd, 3rd and 4th team in the standings gain a chance to take part in the upcoming EHF European League edition.

Due to the 2020 coronavirus outbreak, the relegation round and the playoffs were cancelled.

Regular season

Standings

Results

References

External links
 Official website 

2019–20 domestic handball leagues
Superliga
Superliga
Superliga
Superliga
Superliga